Route 37 is a major east-west arterial route in Winnipeg, Manitoba which connects the suburbs of Transcona and Elmwood with the downtown core.

Route description
The official route begins on Redwood Avenue at that road's intersection with Salter Street in the city's North End. Route 37 passes over the Redwood Bridge and enters the suburb of Elmwood as Hespeler Avenue, until it meets Henderson Highway. Eastbound traffic bears south on Henderson before bearing right to follow Riverton Avenue, which curves into an eastbound Midwinter Avenue. After a short jog south on Levis Street, it joins Nairn Avenue. Westbound traffic turns north off Nairn onto Watt Street before turning west onto Levis, then Johnson Avenue West. Meeting Henderson, route 37 heads south three blocks before bearing west on Hespeler Avenue.

Route 37 continues over the CP main line towards Transcona as Nairn Avenue, Regent Avenue West, Pandora Avenue West, and Pandora Avenue East. It turns southbound on Ravenhurst Street and ends at the intersection of Ravenhurst with Dugald Road.

History
Redwood Avenue was named for the red roof of a store that was once located on the banks of the Red River. Hespeler Avenue was named for William Hespeler, a member of the Manitoba Legislative Assembly, in the early 1900s. Johnson Avenue was named for Francis Godschall Johnson, the governor of Assiniboia from 1855 to 1859. Stadacona Street was named after the Quebec village. Nairn Avenue is named for local businessman Stephen Nairn. Watt Street was known as Archibald Street North prior to 1962.

Major Intersections
From west to east; all intersections are at-grade unless otherwise indicated:

References

037